Tony Gurley (born April 3, 1956) is an American businessman and political figure from North Carolina, currently serving as chief operating officer for the Office of State Budget and Management. He served on the Wake County Board of Commissioners from his election in 2002 until he resigned in 2014 to take the state position. Gurley served as vice-chairman of the board of commissioners in 2005 and as chairman in 2006–2007, and 2010.

By education, Gurley is both a pharmacist and attorney. He is a member of the North Carolina Republican Party. In 2011, Gurley filed paperwork to run for Lieutenant Governor of North Carolina in 2012, but was subsequently defeated by Dan Forest in the Republican primary.

Early life, education and business career
Gurley was born and raised in McDowell County in Western North Carolina. After graduating from high school, Tony attended University of North Carolina and received his Bachelor of Science in Pharmacy in 1978. He continued his studies at UNC and in 1981 received his master's degree in Pharmacy Administration. In 1999, he entered Law School at North Carolina Central University. He received his J.D. degree in 2003. After law school, Gurley opened the Law practice of Gurley & Cookson in Raleigh, although he was not active in practicing law.

Wake County politics
Gurley began his political career in Raleigh in 2002 when he was elected at-large to the Wake County Board of Commissioners. Gurley was re-elected in 2006, and 2010 respectively.

2012 run for lieutenant governor

In March 2011, Gurley announced via Twitter that he filed organizational papers to run for Lieutenant Governor of North Carolina in 2012. In September 2011, Gurley's candidacy was endorsed by former Lieutenant Governor James Carson Gardner, stating that he liked the idea that Gurley, a pharmacy owner, had a background in business. Shortly thereafter, Gurley was also endorsed by Wake County Sheriff Donnie Harrison.

Primary Results

Under state law, if no candidate receives 40 percent of the vote in the primary, the second-place candidate can request a second primary (runoff). Gurley declared that he would ask for such a runoff after finishing second in the unofficial May 8 primary election results. Gurley was defeated by Dan Forest on July 17.

References

External links
Campaign website.

Businesspeople from North Carolina
County commissioners in North Carolina
1956 births
Living people
People from McDowell County, North Carolina
North Carolina Central University alumni
University of North Carolina alumni
North Carolina lawyers